Events from the year 1713 in Scotland.

Incumbents 

 Secretary of State for Scotland: The Earl of Mar

Law officers 
 Lord Advocate – Sir James Stewart
 Solicitor General for Scotland – Thomas Kennedy jointly with Sir James Steuart, Bt.

Judiciary 
 Lord President of the Court of Session – Lord North Berwick
 Lord Justice General – Lord Ilay
 Lord Justice Clerk – Lord Grange

Events 
 December – the post of Regius Professor of Law at the University of Glasgow is established, considered as the foundation of the University of Glasgow School of Law.
 The main radial roads into Edinburgh are turnpiked.

Births 
 25 May – John Stuart, 3rd Earl of Bute, Prime Minister of Great Britain and botanist (died 1792 in England)
 13 October – Allan Ramsay, portrait painter (died 1784 in England)

Deaths 
 20 October – Archibald Pitcairne, physician, classical scholar and satirist (born 1652)

See also 

 Timeline of Scottish history

References 

 
Years of the 18th century in Scotland
Scotland
1710s in Scotland